Herbert Prince (14 January 1892 – 12 January 1986) was an English footballer. He competed in the men's tournament at the 1920 Summer Olympics.

References

External links
 

1892 births
1986 deaths
English footballers
Olympic footballers of Great Britain
Footballers at the 1920 Summer Olympics
Association football forwards
People from South Stoneham